Parliamentary elections were held in Bulgaria on 25 May 1908. The result was a victory for the Democratic Party, which won 166 of the 203 seats. Voter turnout was 50.2%.

Results

References

Bulgaria
1908 in Bulgaria
Parliamentary elections in Bulgaria
May 1908 events
1908 elections in Bulgaria